Events in the year 1734 in Portugal.

Incumbents
Monarch: John V

Births
17 December – Maria I of Portugal, queen (died 1816)
31 December – Francisco Manoel de Nascimento, poet (died 1819)

Deaths
Ignácio Barbosa-Machado, historian (born 1686).

References

 
1730s in Portugal
Portugal
Years of the 18th century in Portugal
Portugal